An Evening With Groucho is the title of a 1972 compilation recording of the one-man show by American comedian Groucho Marx, edited from three separate performances: New York City's Carnegie Hall, C.Y. Stephens Auditorium at Iowa State University, and Masonic Auditorium in San Francisco, California. With the Carnegie Hall show’s introduction by Dick Cavett, the resulting performances were released as a double album by A&M Records. Marx shared family and show business stories and performed songs from Marx Brothers stage shows and movies. Marvin Hamlisch performed an opening overture and accompanied Groucho on the piano. A numbered, limited edition edited single picture disc edition was released in 1978, and a compact disc version was later briefly available.

In 2018, the recording was selected for preservation in the National Recording Registry by the Library of Congress as being "culturally, historically, or artistically significant".

References

Albums recorded at Carnegie Hall
Marx Brothers
1972 live albums
A&M Records live albums
United States National Recording Registry recordings
United States National Recording Registry albums